The Grand Cross of Valour was Rhodesia's highest military decoration, awarded for conspicuous valour by members of the Security Forces in combat.

It was the equivalent of the Victoria Cross, which it replaced, and was formerly conferred on Rhodesian soldiers prior to 1965.

Institution 

The award was instituted in 1970 by Presidential Warrant, the first being made in 1978. The second and final investiture was in June 1980.

Medal 

The medal was a 9 ct gold cross with an enamelled roundel in the centre bearing a lion's head, hung from a V-shaped suspender from a scarlet ribbon woven with a central green stripe edged in white, with a gold stripe between the red and white. The medal was impressed in small capitals with the recipient's name on the reverse, and was awarded with a case of issue, miniature medal for wear, and an illuminated certificate.

Recipients

Just two awards of the Grand Cross of Valour were made. The first recipient was Acting Captain Chris F. Schulenberg, S.C.R. of the Selous Scouts. Following the country's recognised independence as Zimbabwe in 1980, the Grand Cross of Valour was awarded to Major Grahame Wilson, S.C.R., B.C.R., second-in-command of the Rhodesian SAS, and Rhodesia's most highly decorated soldier. Recipients were entitled to the post-nominal letters G.C.V.

Zimbabwe

The Grand Cross of Valour was superseded in October 1980 by the Gold Cross of Zimbabwe, which is presented for conspicuous bravery in perilous conditions, but which can be awarded to civilians as well as military personnel.

See also

Orders, Medals and Decorations of Zimbabwe

References

Pittaway, J, and Fourie, C., 2003. SAS Rhodesia, Dandy Agencies, South Africa. 
Saffery, D., 2006. The Rhodesia Medal Roll, Jeppestown Press, United Kingdom. 

Military awards and decorations of Rhodesia
Courage awards
1970 establishments in Rhodesia
1980 disestablishments in Zimbabwe
Awards established in 1970